Kumma may refer to:

 Kumma, Estonia, a village in Kehtna Parish, Rapla County
 Kumma, Iran, a village in Gilan Province
 Kumma (Nubia) or Semna East, an archaeological site in Sudan
 Kuma (Cap), a type of cap traditionally worn in Oman